Events from the year 1705 in the Kingdom of Scotland.

Incumbents 
 Monarch – Anne
 Secretary of State –
 until March: John Ker, 5th Earl of Roxburghe jointly with James Ogilvy, 1st Earl of Seafield
 March–June: John Ker, 5th Earl of Roxburghe jointly with William Johnstone, 1st Marquess of Annandale
 June–September: William Johnstone, 1st Marquess of Annandale jointly with Hugh Campbell, 3rd Earl of Loudoun
 from September: Hugh Campbell, 3rd Earl of Loudoun, jointly with John Erskine, 6th Earl of Mar

Law officers 
 Lord Advocate – Sir James Stewart
 Solicitor General for Scotland – William Carmichael

Judiciary 
 Lord President of the Court of Session – Lord North Berwick
 Lord Justice General – Lord Tarbat
 Lord Justice Clerk – Lord Whitelaw, then Lord Ormiston

Events 
 30 January – Janet Cornfoot is killed by a mob, and Thomas Brown is starved to death, for accusations of witchcraft at Pittenweem subsequently exposed as perjuries.
 14–19 February – date of first Edinburgh Courant newspaper published, by printer James Watson.
 March – the Parliament of England passes the Alien Act in response to the Parliament of Scotland's Act of Security 1704; it is repealed in December without taking effect.
 11 April – English captain Thomas Green and two of his crew are hanged at Leith for alleged piracy on the Malabar Coast.
 20 July – Act of the Parliament of Scotland for the promotion of salmon, white and herring fishing.
 September – negotiations for a Treaty of Union with England are resumed. At about this time, the independent pro-Union group around John Hay, 2nd Marquess of Tweeddale, is first nicknamed the Squadrone Volante.
 Lord Archibald Campbell appointed Lord High Treasurer of Scotland.

Births 
 2 March – William Murray, 1st Earl of Mansfield, judge and politician (died 1793)
 5 May – John Campbell, 4th Earl of Loudoun, noble and military leader (died 1782)
Date unknown
 David Mallet, writer (died 1765)

Deaths 
 11 March – Margaret Wemyss, 3rd Countess of Wemyss (born 1659)
 14 March – James Scott, Earl of Dalkeith (born 1674)
Date unknown
 Alexander Arbuthnot, politician (born 1654)

See also 
 Timeline of Scottish history

References 

 
Years of the 18th century in Scotland
1700s in Scotland